Jomercocha (possibly from Quechua q'umir green, qucha lake, "green lake") is a lake in Peru located in the Cusco Region, Quispicanchi Province, Camanti District. Jomercocha lies north of the mountain Vizcachani, near the Ajocunca.

References 

Lakes of Peru
Lakes of Cusco Region